Trimecaine (systematic name (2,4,6-trimethylphenylcarbamoylmethyl)diethylammonium chloride, chemical formula C15H25ClN2O) is an organic compound used as a local anesthetic and cardial antiarrhythmic. It is white crystalline powder readily soluble in water and ethanol. It is an active ingredient in products available under trademarks Mesdicain, Mesocain, Mesokain and others.

History
Trimecaine is probably a Czech discovery (in light of complex pharmacological and clinical evaluation and practical deployment) although its preparation was published by Löfgren in 1946.

Action mechanism, pharmacokinetics
Like other local anesthetics belonging in the amide group trimecaine decreases the cell membrane permeability, causes depolarization and shortens the action potential. Anesthetic effect starts within 15 minutes and remains 60–90 minutes. Its biological half-life is ca. 90 minutes. 10% of trimecaine is excreted unchanged (90% as its metabolites). It passes through the hematoencephalic and placental barriers.

Indication
Trimecaine has two main application fields. The first one is local anesthesia (topical, infiltrational, topical mucosal and inhalational, spinal and Bier's intravenous). It is used in concentrations 0.4 up to 4%, in some cases (e.g. in stomatology) in mixtures with adrenaline. The other field is prophylaxis and therapy of ventriculous arrhythmia on myocardial infarction and in cardiosurgery. It is used also for prophylaxis of sympathetic reaction during tracheal intubations.

Contraindication
Trimecaine must not be used at hypersensitivity on amide anesthetics, hypervolemia, hypotension, cardial conduction defects, asystole, cardiogenic shock and malignant hyperthermia in anamnesis.

Adverse effects
Rarely allergic reactions may occur (from dermal or mucosal symptoms to anaphylactic shock). At overdosing a toxical reaction arises - excitation, agitation, dishevelment, visual defects, buzzing in ears, muscle thrill to tremor, in more severe cases somnolence, hyporeflexia, breathing defects to apnea, convulsions.

References

Local anesthetics
Antiarrhythmic agents
Acetanilides
Diethylamino compounds